Floyd Milton "Cody" Clark (August 13, 1882 – November 14, 1931) was an American football player and coach.  Clark was the sixth head football coach at Marquette University in Milwaukee, Wisconsin and he held that position for the 1907 season.
His coaching record at Marquette was 6–0.

Clark died at a hospital in Alliance, Nebraska after a long illness in 1931.

Head coaching record

References

1882 births
1931 deaths
American football halfbacks
Marquette Golden Avalanche football coaches
Wisconsin Badgers football players
Players of American football from Wisconsin